The  refers to the advance of the cherry blossoms across Japan. The Japan Meteorological Agency records the opening and full bloom of the blossoms from Kyūshū in late March to Hokkaidō in the middle of May. The advancing front is also the subject of regular reports by the major news agencies. The cherry blossom is of great public interest in Japan due to its symbolism and the custom of flower viewing known as hanami.

Forecasts
From 1951 the Japan Meteorological Agency produced forecasts for the Kantō region and from 1955 for the whole of Japan excepting Okinawa and the Amami Islands. From 2010, the Agency left forecasting to the private sector although it continues to observe and determine the impact of the climate upon the flowering of the cherry. The forecast is based on the Arrhenius equation, with the formula

where T is the mean day temperature in kelvins, and DTS represents the number of days transformed to standard temperature.

Blossoming
The day of opening is defined as the point at which at least five to six flowers have opened on the sample tree. The day of full bloom is when at least 80% of the flowers have opened. The Yoshino cherry is typically observed since, from the late Edo period, it has been planted across the archipelago. Sample trees also include the Higan cherry in the south and Prunus sargentii (Sargent's cherry) in the north.

In 2006 it was reported that the cherry blossoms might overtake the plum blossoms before reaching Hokkaidō.

Sample trees

There are fifty-nine sample trees at any one time. Successor junior trees are selected from among prospective candidates when an incumbent becomes too old or is otherwise incapacitated. For instance, the sample tree in Mito collapsed under the weight of snow in 2005, while that at the southern tip of Ishigaki Island was felled by a typhoon a year later. The fifty-nine sample trees are located across Japan, corresponding to the sites of the Agency's principal weather stations:
 Okinawa: Ishigaki, Miyako-jima, Naha, Minamidaitō
 Kyūshū/Yamaguchi: Fukuoka, Shimonoseki, Ōita, Nagasaki, Saga, Kumamoto, Miyazaki, Kagoshima, Amami (formerly Naze)
 Shikoku: Takamatsu, Tokushima, Matsuyama, Kōchi
 Chūgoku: Hiroshima, Okayama, Matsue, Tottori
 Kinki: Ōsaka, Hikone, Kyōto, Maizuru, Kobe, Nara, Wakayama
 Tōkai: Nagoya, Shizuoka, Gifu, Tsu
 Kantō: Tōkyō, Mito, Utsunomiya, Maebashi, Kumagaya, Chōshi, Yokohama, Nagano, Kōfu
 Hokuriku: Niigata, Toyama, Kanazawa, Fukui
 Tōhoku: Sendai, Aomori, Akita, Morioka, Yamagata, Fukushima
 Hokkaidō: Sapporo, Wakkanai, Asahikawa, Abashiri, Obihiro, Kushiro, Muroran, Hakodate.

See also
 Leaf peeping
 Ueno Park

Notes

References

External links
  2012 day of opening (JMA record)
  2012 day of full bloom (JMA record)
  2011 day of opening (JMA record)
  2011 day of full bloom (JMA record)
  JMA flowering data, 1953–2010

Cherry blossom
Japanese culture
Japan Meteorological Agency